Bromley Palace (also known as the Bishop's Palace) is a manor house in Bromley, London Borough of Bromley; and was the residence of the Bishops of Rochester from the 12th century to 1845. The building, which is now part of Bromley Civic centre, is a Grade II listed building.

History of the site

In the 8th century, King Æthelbert II of Kent granted 6 "sulings" of land, which came to be known as the Manor of Bromley, to Eardwulf, Bishop of Rochester. In 862 Æthelberht III, king of Wessex and Kent, granted 10 sulings in Bromley to his minister Dryhtwald.  In 967, King Edgar I of England again granted 10 sulings of land to Bishop Ælfstan in return for a large sum in gold and silver.

In the year 987, a dispute between King Ethelred II and the Bishop of Rochester led to the land being seized and given to one of the king's ministers (Æthelsine) though a royal act of contrition led to its return in 998. After the conquest, another expropriation was attempted by Bishop Odo of Bayeux (half-brother of William the Conqueror himself) and Archbishop Lanfranc (of Canterbury)  had to intervene to restore the land to the diocese.

The Manor of Bromley was described as "poor....neither pasture nor arable land being worth much". It is thought that a manor house was first built here around the year 1100. One source claims that the architect was Bishop Gundulph but this seems unlikely because he had a reputation for commissioning buildings of "massive and enduring character" and records show that Bromley Palace had fallen into dilapidation by the time of Bishop Waleran, who died in 1184. As a result, Waleran's successor, Gilbert de Glanville, ordered the manor house to be rebuilt – "in a more commodious manner". A historian had this to say about the original manor house:

The first house and gardens probably did not cover a larger space than two acres, and were surrounded by a moat. The masonry supporting the ancient drawbridge, the remains of which consisted of a rude mass of flint and chalk, cemented together by mortar which had become as hard as stone, was discovered....about forty-five yards north of the present house; and....to the south....foundation walls, the lower portions of which were constructed of blocks of chalk.

The grounds of the palace contained a Holy Well and Oratory dedicated to Saint Blaise and the site became a place of pilgrimage for centuries.

In 1648, during the English Civil War – and due to an Act of Parliament which ordered the disposal of certain church property – the manor of Bromley was sold to Augustine Skinner. The manor house was again returned to the Diocese of Rochester (and its rightful incumbent, Bishop John Warner) in 1660, on the restoration of Charles II.

In 1669, Bishop Sprat had the existing chapel (which was "wainscotted eight foote high with oake") pulled down and rebuilt (the new chapel was consecrated in 1701), and improvements were made to the grounds of the palace. Further additions and improvements were made to the manor by Bishops Francis Atterbury (served 1713–1723) and Joseph Wilcocks (served 1731–1756). But by 1774 the palace had fallen into disrepair and Bishop John Thomas ordered it to be pulled down and rebuilt – see illustration.

In 1845 the palace passed out of the hands of the Bishops of Rochester when it was sold to Coles Child, a wealthy local businessman. He had the house remodelled in 1863 (reputedly by Richard Norman Shaw) and 1903/1920s (reputedly by Ernest Newton).

The 107th edition of Burkes Peerage, (2003), states the Coles were Lords of the Manor of Bromley, and lived in the Palace. The actor Sir Coles John Jeremy Child, (1944-2022), was a member of the family.

In the 1920s it became a girls' finishing school and in 1935 Stockwell College of Education, a teacher training college. Extensions were added for this, and again in 1960 when Kent County Council – then the county authority - took control. It became a grade II listed building in 1973. The college closed in 1980 and, as part of a wider regeneration scheme to create a new Civic Centre, the London Borough of Bromley moved their headquarters from the town hall to the palace in 1982.

A small area of the original parkland survives immediately around the palace. It comprises lawns, a lake, belts of mature trees, a boat house, pulhamite rockeries, an ice house (building) and a folly.

See also
Bishop of Rochester
St Blaise's Well

References

Further reading

 Lysons, Daniel. The Environs of London – vol. 4: Counties of Herts, Essex & Kent (1796), pp307–323.
 Hasted, Edward. The History and Topographical Survey of the County of Kent: Volume 1 (1797), pp550–570.
 Dunkin, John. History and Antiquities of Bromley (1815).
Strong, Edward. A History of Bromley in Kent (Edward Strong, 1858) pp33 ff.
Thorne, James. Handbook to the environs of London (John Murray, 1876), pp60–63.
 Clinch, George. Antiquarian Jottings relating to Bromley, Hayes, Keston and West Wickham in Kent (1889).
Walford, Edward. Greater London: a narrative of its history, its people, and its places (Adamant Media Corporation, 1894).
Ditchfield, P. H. & Clinch, George. Memorials of old Kent (Bemrose & sons, limited, 1907) pp. 203–204.

External links

Bromley Palace (Old b/w photograph).
Bromley Palace (Photo taken in 1990).

Country houses in London
Houses in the London Borough of Bromley
Episcopal palaces in London
Grade II listed buildings in the London Borough of Bromley